was the twenty-seventh single of J-pop girl group Morning Musume, and was the debut of seventh generation member Koharu Kusumi.

The limited edition of this single came with special packaging and also contained five photocards. The Single V was released on August 3, 2005, and sold a total of 22,606 copies. It reached number four on the Oricon Charts.

Track listing

CD 
  
  
 "Iroppoi Jirettai" (Instrumental)

Single V DVD 
 "Iroppoi Jirettai" 
 "Iroppoi Jirettai (Dance Shot Ver.)"

Event V 
 "Iroppoi Jirettai (Multi Dance Ver.)" 
 "Iroppoi Jirettai (Multi Dance Ver. 2)" 
 "Iroppoi Jirettai (Close-up Ver.)"

Personnel
Hitomi Yoshizawa – center vocals
Ai Takahashi – main vocals
Asami Konno – minor vocals
Makoto Ogawa – minor vocals
Risa Niigaki – center vocals
Miki Fujimoto – main vocals
Eri Kamei – center vocals
Sayumi Michishige – minor vocals
Reina Tanaka – main vocals
Koharu Kusumi – center vocals

Members at the time of this single 
 4th generation: Hitomi Yoshizawa
 5th generation: Ai Takahashi, Asami Konno, Makoto Ogawa, Risa Niigaki
 6th generation: Miki Fujimoto, Eri Kamei, Sayumi Michishige, Reina Tanaka 
 7th generation : Koharu Kusumi

External links 
UP-FRONT WORKS: Morning Musume discography entry

Morning Musume songs
Zetima Records singles
2005 singles
Song recordings produced by Tsunku
Japanese-language songs
Dance-pop songs
Torch songs